Leandro Luis Cedaro (born 16 February 1988) is an Argentine-born Italian rugby union player. Debutó en Regatas Resistencia He plays as a prop and as a lock. Cedaro currently plays for Stade Montois in Pro D2.

In 2012 Cedaro was named in the Emerging Italy squad. He counts 1 caps for Italy, since his debut at 22 June 2013.

References

External links

ESPN Profile

1988 births
Living people
Italian rugby union players
Italy international rugby union players
Rugby union locks
People from Resistencia, Chaco
Stade Montois players
Stade Rochelais players
SU Agen Lot-et-Garonne players